The 2013–14 Iowa State Cyclones women's basketball team represented Iowa State University in the 2013–14 NCAA Division I women's basketball season. This was head coach Bill Fennelly's 19th season at Iowa State. The Cyclones were members of the Big 12 Conference and played their home games at the Hilton Coliseum.  The Cyclones earned their 14th NCAA tournament appearance. They finished the season with a record of 20–11 overall, 9–9 in Big 12 play for a tie to finish in fifth place. They lost in the quarterfinals of the 2014 Big 12 Conference women's basketball tournament to Oklahoma State. They were invited to the 2014 NCAA Division I women's basketball tournament which they lost to Florida State in the first round.

Radio
All Cyclones games were carried on the Iowa State Cyclone Radio Network. Not all affiliates carried women's basketball, and some affiliates only carried select games. To learn which stations will carry games, please visit the Cyclone Radio Network affiliate list linked here. Brent Blum and Molly Parrott called all the action for the Cyclone Radio Network and for games on Cyclones.tv .

Roster

Schedule
Source

|-
!colspan=9 style="background:#FFD700; color:#C41E3A;"| Exhibition

|-
!colspan=9 style="background:#C41E3A; color:#FFD700;"| Regular Season

|-
!colspan=9 style="background:#FFD700; color:#C41E3A;"| Big 12 tournament

|-
!colspan=12 style="background:#840A2C; color:#FEC938;"| NCAA tournament

Rankings

References

Portland
Iowa State Cyclones women's basketball seasons
Iowa State
Iowa State Cyc
Iowa State Cyc